is a passenger railway station located in the city of Kōnosu, Saitama, Japan, operated by East Japan Railway Company (JR East) .

Lines
Kōnosu Station is served by the Takasaki Line, with through Shōnan-Shinjuku Line and Ueno-Tokyo Line services to and from the Tokaido Line.

Station layout
The station has a side platform and an island platform serving three tracks, connected by a footbridge, with an elevated station building located above the platforms. The station has a "Midori no Madoguchi" staffed ticket office.

Platforms

History 
The station opened on 28 July 1883. With the privatization of Japanese National Railways (JNR) on 1 April 1987, the station came under the control of JR East.

Passenger statistics
In fiscal 2019, the station was used by an average of 19,345 passengers daily (boarding passengers only). The passenger figures for previous years are as shown below.

Surrounding area
 Elumi Konosu shopping mall (adjoining station)
 Kōnosu City Hall
 Kōnosu Post Office

See also
List of railway stations in Japan

References

External links

JR East station information 

Stations of East Japan Railway Company
Railway stations in Saitama Prefecture
Takasaki Line
Shōnan-Shinjuku Line
Railway stations in Japan opened in 1883
Kōnosu